Russell Christopher (12 March 1930 in Grand Rapids, Michigan – 9 November 2014) was an American operatic baritone who specialized in comprimario roles. He received his Bachelor's and master's degrees from the University of Michigan, where he was a soloist in the University of Michigan Men's Glee Club. His voice teachers included Philip Duey and Raymond McDermot. He made his professional opera debut in 1959 as the Emperor in Giacomo Puccini's Turandot. In 1963 he won the Metropolitan Opera National Council Auditions. Between 1963 and 1991 he appeared in a total of 1,410 performances at the Metropolitan Opera.

References

1930 births
2014 deaths
American operatic baritones
University of Michigan alumni
Winners of the Metropolitan Opera National Council Auditions
Grand Rapids Community College alumni